Guðjón Baldvinsson (born 15 February 1986) is an Icelandic international former footballer who played as a striker.

Club career
Born in Garðabær, Guðjón began his career in 2003 with Stjarnan. He signed for KR Reykjavík for the 2008 season, before moving to Sweden to play with GAIS in the 2009 season. He then played with KR Reykjavík, Halmstad, FC Nordsjælland and Stjarnan.

He moved on loan to Indian Super League side Kerala Blasters in January 2018.

International career
Guðjón made his national team debut in March 2009.

References

1986 births
Living people
Gudjon Baldvinsson
Gudjon Baldvinsson
Gudjon Baldvinsson
Gudjon Baldvinsson
Gudjon Baldvinsson
Allsvenskan players
GAIS players
Halmstads BK players
Gudjon Baldvinsson
Gudjon Baldvinsson
Expatriate footballers in Sweden
Gudjon Baldvinsson
Kerala Blasters FC players
Gudjon Baldvinsson
Expatriate footballers in India
FC Nordsjælland players
Gudjon Baldvinsson
Gudjon Baldvinsson
Expatriate men's footballers in Denmark
Association football forwards
Superettan players
Gudjon Baldvinsson
Danish Superliga players